In functional analysis and related areas of mathematics, a Montel space, named after Paul Montel, is any topological vector space (TVS) in which an analog of Montel's theorem holds.  Specifically, a Montel space is a barrelled topological vector space in which every closed and bounded subset is compact.

Definition

A topological vector space (TVS) has the  if every closed and bounded subset is compact. 
A  is a barrelled topological vector space with the Heine–Borel property.
A subset of a TVS is compact if and only if it is complete and totally bounded.
A  is a Fréchet space that is also a Montel space.

Characterizations

A separable Fréchet space is a Montel space if and only if each weak-* convergent sequence in its continuous dual is strongly convergent.

Moreover, if  denotes the vector space of all bounded continuous functions on a Fréchet space  then  is Montel if and only if every sequence in  that converges to zero in the compact-open topology also converges uniformly to zero on all closed bounded absolutely convex subsets of

Sufficient conditions

Semi-Montel spaces

A closed vector subspace of a semi-Montel space is again a semi-Montel space.  The locally convex direct sum of any family of semi-Montel spaces is again a semi-Montel space.  The inverse limit of an inverse system consisting of semi-Montel spaces is again a semi-Montel space.  The Cartesian product of any family of semi-Montel spaces (resp. Montel spaces) is again a semi-Montel space (resp. a Montel space).

Montel spaces

The strong dual of a Montel space is Montel.  
A barrelled quasi-complete nuclear space is a Montel space.  
Every product and locally convex direct sum of a family of Montel spaces is a Montel space.  
The strict inductive limit of a sequence of Montel spaces is a Montel space.  In contrast, closed subspaces and separated quotients of Montel spaces are in general not even reflexive.  
Every Fréchet Schwartz space is a Montel space.

Properties

Montel spaces are paracompact and normal.  
Semi-Montel spaces are quasi-complete and semi-reflexive while Montel spaces are reflexive.  

No infinite-dimensional Banach space is a Montel space.  This is because a Banach space cannot satisfy the Heine–Borel property: the closed unit ball is closed and bounded, but not compact.  
Fréchet Montel spaces are separable and have a bornological strong dual.  
A metrizable Montel space is separable.

Fréchet–Montel spaces are distinguished spaces.

Examples

In classical complex analysis, Montel's theorem asserts that the space of holomorphic functions on an open connected subset of the complex numbers has this property.

Many Montel spaces of contemporary interest arise as spaces of test functions for a space of distributions. 

Similarly, the space of compactly supported functions in an open set with the final topology of the family of inclusions  as  ranges over all compact subsets of  The Schwartz space is also a Montel space.

Counter-examples

Every infinite-dimensional normed space is a barrelled space that is  a Montel space. 
In particular, every infinite-dimensional Banach space is not a Montel space.  
There exist Montel spaces that are not separable and there exist Montel spaces that are not complete. 
There exist Montel spaces having closed vector subspaces that are  Montel spaces.

See also

Notes

References

  
  
  
  
  
  
  
  
  
  
  
  
  
  
  
 

Functional analysis
Topological vector spaces